Romanesque may refer to:

In art and architecture 

First Romanesque, or Lombard Romanesque architectural style
Pre-Romanesque art and architecture, a term used for the early phase of the style
Romanesque architecture, architecture of Europe which emerged in the late 10th century and lasted to the 13th century 
Romanesque secular and domestic architecture
Brick Romanesque, North Germany and Baltic
Norman architecture, the traditional term for the style in English
Spanish Romanesque
Romanesque architecture in France
Romanesque art, the art of Western Europe from approximately AD 1000 to the 13th century or later
Romanesque Revival architecture, an architectural style which started in the mid-19th century, inspired by the original Romanesque architecture
Richardsonian Romanesque, a style of Romanesque Revival architecture named for an American architect

Other uses 
 Romanesque (EP), EP by Japanese rock band Buck-Tick
 "Romanesque" (song), a 2007 single by Japanese pop duo FictionJunction Yuuka
Romanesque Road, a scenic route in Germany

See also
 Romanesco (disambiguation)